Ben Howard (born 7 February 1993 in Bradford, West Yorkshire, England) is a British rugby union football player, playing for Old Elthamians in the National League 1. He is a winger who has represented England at Under-20 level.

Howard joined Worcester aged 18, and made his Premiership debut against Leicester Tigers at Welford Road in September 2012. He scored two tries on his European debut against Gernika RT in the Amlin Challenge Cup. Howard was in the England Under-20 side that won the Six Nations Championship in 2013, and went on to defeat Wales in the Junior World Cup Final in France in June 2013.

References

External links
 Bbc.co.uk
 Warriors.co.uk
 Rugbyworld.com

1993 births
Living people
British rugby union players
Worcester Warriors players
Rugby union wings